Andrew Harwood Mills (born 5 January 1980 in Halifax, West Yorkshire) is an English actor.

Biography

Early life

Andrew Harwood Mills was born in Halifax, West Yorkshire. He grew up in the village of Heptonstall, famous for Ted Hughes, Sylvia Plath, and John Wesley among others. Heptonstall has been used many times as a location for various film and television productions including The Gemma Factor, and Happy Valley (TV series).

Andrew began acting at the Angles Theatre, Wisbech where he starred as the Tin Man in The Wiz and Captain Hardy in Journey's End by R. C. Sherriff.

Andrew studied acting at the Royal Welsh College of Music and Drama (RWCMD) in Cardiff graduating in 2005. He was sponsored by actors Richard Wilson, Tony Maudsley, Lesley Staples and Michael Burrell. He was in the same class as James Sutton, Zahra Ahmadi and Craig Gazey.

Andrew has appeared in numerous theatrical productions including Guys and Dolls, The Laramie Project and Merrily We Roll Along at the Sherman Cymru, Cardiff. He played the lead role of Leonard in Loon written by Katie Borland which premiered at the Theatre Royal Stratford East, the theatre made famous by Joan Littlewood.

Andrew is a grade 8 pianist.

Career

In 2009 he played Iago in Being Othello, a film adaption of Shakespeare's Othello, written and directed by the BAFTA nominated and award winning director Suri Krishnamma. Being Othello was premiered at BAFTA on 17 April 2009.

In 2010 he appeared in the feature film 4.3.2.1. directed by BAFTA award winner Noel Clarke. The film was released by Universal Pictures and starred Emma Roberts, Tamsin Egerton, Ophelia Lovibond, Mandy Patinkin, Kevin Smith and Sean Pertwee.

In 2011 Andrew starred in War Games: At the End of the Day directed by award winning Italian director Cosimo Alemà. It was released in Italian cinemas by Bolero and by Universal Pictures in the UK. The film premiered at the Raindance Film Festival where it competed for Best International Feature. The film also stars Sam Cohan (Oliviero Rising), Valene Kane (Rogue One: A Star Wars Story, The Fall (TV series)) and Daniel Vivian (The Young Pope, X-Men (film)).

Andrew stars in the debut music video for the single 'My Fault' by Senadee.

Andrew stars in the Mystery Jets music video for the single Someone Purer from the album Radlands.

Andrew stars in two music videos for the rock band Lacuna Coil. Both videos showcase tracks from the album Delirium and are directed by Cosimo Alemà. The first video, for the track "Blood Tears Dust" was released on Vevo on 22 March 2017. The second music video is for the track, "You Love Me 'Cause I Hate You".

Filmography

References

External links

Andrew Harwood Mills Official Site
Andrew Harwood Mills Interview
Senadee 'My Fault' Music Video

1980 births
Living people
Alumni of the Royal Welsh College of Music & Drama
English male film actors
English male stage actors
People from Halifax, West Yorkshire